Monty Madaris (born September 8, 1993) is an American football wide receiver who is currently a free agent. He played college football at Michigan State, and signed with the Bengals as an undrafted free agent in 2017.

Professional career
Madaris was signed by the Cincinnati Bengals as an undrafted free agent on May 5, 2017. He was placed on the physically unable to perform list on July 29, 2017 after failing his physical. He was waived on August 1, 2017.

References

External links
Michigan State Spartans bio

1993 births
Living people
Players of American football from Cincinnati
American football wide receivers
Michigan State Spartans football players
Cincinnati Bengals players